Budurovignathus is an extinct genus of conodont.

Use in stratigraphy 
The Ladinian stage of the Middle Triassic is defined by the first appearance of Budurovignathus praehungaricus.

The global reference profile for the base (the GSSP) is at an outcrop in the river bed of the Caffaro river at Bagolino, in the province of Brescia, northern Italy.

References 

 Revision of conodont genera Sephardiella March, Budurov, Hirsch and Marquez-Aliaga, 1988 and Budurovignathus Kozur, 1988. MN Sudar, Geologica Balcanica, 1989

External links 
 
 

Conodont genera
Triassic conodonts